Tepu is a panchayat village in Bap tehsil, Jodhpur District, Rajasthan, India. It consists of three villages:
 Jodhani Tepoo, population 1085 
 Durjani, population 640 
 Kanasi Moti, population 697 

Other statistics about Tepu:
 Altitude: 
 Pin Code: 342301
 Telephone code: 02925

External links
 Census of India 
 India by Road

Villages in Jodhpur district